Sir Ernest Frederic George Hatch, 1st Baronet, KBE (12 April 1859 – 17 August 1927) was a British politician.

He was the son of John William Hatch of London and Matilda Augusta Snell of Callington, Cornwall. Following a private education, he went into business as a wine merchant, and in 1894 established Hatch, Mansfield and Company, working with James Mansfield, who became managing director.

Hatch was unsuccessful Conservative parliamentary candidate for the Gorton Division of Lancashire at a by-election in 1889 and at the succeeding general election in 1892. On his third attempt, in the 1895 election, he was elected as Gorton's MP.

Hatch remained as Conservative member for Gorton until 1904, when his disagreement with Joseph Chamberlain over free trade led to him crossing the floor to the Liberal Party. At the next general election in 1906 he had little support from Liberal activists for his candidature, and accordingly withdrew.

In 1908 he was created a baronet, "of Portland Place, in the Metropolitan Borough of St Marylebone". He was appointed chairman and treasurer of University College Hospital, London

During the First World War he chaired the Government Commission on Belgian Refugees, and was made a commander of the Belgian Order of the Crown. He was also Chairman of Council of the Beyond Seas Association for Reception of Officers and Relatives from beyond the seas, and for this he was appointed Knight Commander of the Order of the British Empire (KBE) in the 1920 New Year Honours.

Ernest Hatch married Lady Constance Blanche Godolphin Osborne in 1900, aunt of John Osborne, later Duke of Leeds. They had one daughter, and the baronetcy became extinct on Sir Ernest's death in 1927.

Footnotes

References
Obituary, The Times, 18 August 1927

1859 births
1927 deaths
People from Callington, Cornwall
Conservative Party (UK) MPs for English constituencies
Liberal Party (UK) MPs for English constituencies
UK MPs 1895–1900
UK MPs 1900–1906
English businesspeople

Baronets in the Baronetage of the United Kingdom
Commanders of the Order of the Crown (Belgium)
Knights Commander of the Order of the British Empire